The  is a  panoramic path that runs through the Peloritani mountains in Sicily at a height of around . Its origins are lost in time.

References 

Sicily
Geography of Sicily